Roquet may refer to:

 Ghislaine Roquet (1926–2016), Companion of the Order of Canada
 Martinique's anole, a species of lizard whose scientific name is Anolis roquet
 Roquet, the technique of hitting an adjacent opponent's ball in croquet
 Roque, an American version of croquet
 Le Roquet, a comics convention founded by Dylan Horrocks
 roquet, a French term of disparagement for a small dog
 Roquette Frères, a starch production company

See also 
 Roquettes, Haute-Garonne, France; a commune
 Roquetes (disambiguation)
 Roquette (disambiguation)
 Rocket (disambiguation)